The women's long jump at the 1998 European Athletics Championships was held at the Népstadion on 21 and 22 August.

Medalists

Results

Qualification
Qualification: Qualification Performance 6.65 (Q) or at least 12 best performers advance to the final.

Final

References

Results
Results
Results

Long Jump
Long jump at the European Athletics Championships
1998 in women's athletics